James Stewart, 1st Duke of Richmond, 4th Duke of Lennox KG (6 April 1612 – 30 March 1655), lord of the Manor of Cobham, Kent, was a Scottish nobleman. A third cousin of King Charles I, he was a Privy Councillor and a key member of the Royalist party in the English Civil War. In 1641–42, he served as Lord Warden of the Cinque Ports.  He spent five months in exile in 1643, returning to England to defend the city of Oxford for the king.

Origins
He was the eldest son of Esmé Stewart, 3rd Duke of Lennox (1579–1624) by his wife Katherine Clifton, 2nd Baroness Clifton (c.1592–1637).

Career
He inherited the Dukedom of Lennox on his father's death in 1624 and in 1625, at the age of 13, was made a Gentleman of the Bedchamber to the newly crowned King Charles I, who knighted him on 29 June 1630 and invested him as a knight of Order of the Garter in 1633.

Dukedom of Richmond
The Earldom of Richmond had become absorbed into the crown in 1485 when Henry Tudor, Earl of Richmond, became King Henry VII. The Scottish connection to the Richmond title began in 1613 when James Stewart's uncle Ludovic Stewart, 2nd Duke of Lennox (1574–1624), was created by King James I as Earl of Richmond and was later, in 1623, created by the same king Duke of Richmond and Earl of Newcastle. However he died childless a year later when all his titles (excepting those inherited from his father, namely Duke and Earl of Lennox) became extinct. On 21 August 1637 he was created the 3rd Baron Clifton via his mother.

The title Duke of Richmond was re-created in 1641 by King Charles I for Ludovic's nephew and eventual heir James Stewart, 4th Duke of Lennox, who was also granted Cobham Hall and the manor of Cobham, Kent, which became his main residence.

Marriage and children
On 3 August 1637, he married Mary Villiers, a daughter of George Villiers, 1st Duke of Buckingham, by whom he had issue:
Esmé Stewart, 2nd Duke of Richmond, 5th Duke of Lennox (1649–1660) who died aged 10 in 1660, whereupon both titles descended to his first-cousin Charles Stewart, 3rd Duke of Richmond, 6th Duke of Lennox (1638–1672).
Lady Mary Stewart (10 July 1651 – 4 July 1668), Baroness Clifton in 1660; married Richard Butler, 1st Earl of Arran. No issue.

Death and burial
He died on 30 March 1655 aged 42 and was buried in Westminster Abbey.

See also
 Lord Bernard Stewart (younger brother)
 Siege of Oxford

Notes

References
 Entry at ThePeerage.com
 Weiss Gallery, Illustrious Company: Early Portraits 1545–1720, 1998 (catalogue with commentary).

External links

1612 births
1655 deaths
Lord High Admirals of Scotland
Lords Warden of the Cinque Ports
201
104
James Stewart
Knights of the Garter
Lord Chamberlains of Scotland
James Stewart, 1st Duke of Richmond
Members of the Parliament of Scotland 1628–1633
17th-century Scottish military personnel
17th-century Scottish peers
Barons Clifton
Burials at Westminster Abbey